Hudson Foods Company of Rogers, Arkansas, was a poultry & beef processor that was involved in what was then the largest recall of processed  beef in the United States In 1997.   The small, 300 employee plant was in Columbus, Nebraska. The company was forced to recall over 25 million pounds of processed ground beef, that was produced  months prior to the recall.   Bacteria was NEVER found within the plant.  The source was later located at one of the whole beef kill suppliers in another state, who provided the beef for this process only facility.   Until now, the nation's largest recall was of 25 million pounds of ground beef produced by Hudson Foods in 1997. After that recall there was a move in Democrat held Congress to increase the number of inspections and tighten safety standards in packing plants, which was later exposed as the reason for the large, ineffective recall set into motion by the Clinton administration with the full backing of the Tyson Company,  who benefited fully at the loss of their main competitor in the poultry industry. |work=New York Times |date= 2002-10-14|access-date=2007-09-25 }}</ref> Tyson Foods Tyson bought Hudson Foods out after the fallout from the coverage of this recall, late in the 1990s.

See also
Pilgrim's Pride poultry recall
Topps Meat Company second largest beef recall

References

Further reading
US Department of Justice Press Release: Hudson Foods Company
US Department of Agriculture Press Release: Hudson Foods Company

Food recalls
Meat companies of the United States
Tyson Foods